Kaltayevo (Qaltay) is a rural locality (a selo) in Sharipovsky Selsoviet, Kushnarenkovsky District, Bashkortostan, Russia. The population was 576 as of 2010. There are 14 streets.

Geography 
Kaltayevo is located 22 km south of Kushnarenkovo (the district's administrative centre) by road. Gurgureyevo is the nearest rural locality.

References 

Rural localities in Kushnarenkovsky District